Daughter of the Regiment is a 1953 Austrian historical comedy film directed by Georg C. Klaren and starring Aglaja Schmid, Robert Lindner, and Hermann Erhardt. It is based on the storyline of the 1840 opera La fille du regiment by Gaetano Donizetti. The plot had previously been used for a 1929 silent film and a 1933 sound film, and another film version was made during 1953 by Géza von Bolváry.

It was shot using Agfacolor at the Soviet-controlled Rosenhügel Studios in Vienna. The film's sets were designed by Leo Metzenbauer and Hans Zehetner.

A Tyrolean rifle regiment adopt a young baby girl they have rescued and she becomes the "Daughter of the Regiment". In 1811, as a full-grown woman she falls in love with one of the new recruits while the regiment battles French forces during the Napoleonic Wars.

Cast
Aglaja Schmid as Marie
Robert Lindner as Toni
Hermann Erhardt as Sulpitz
Dagny Servaes as Marquise
Gusti Wolf as Annette
Günther Haenel as Hortensio
Elisabeth Markus as Herzogin
Karl Fochler as Herzog
Fritz Muliar as Hans
Michael Janisch as Karl
Anton Gaugl as Sepp
Peter Klein as Anderl
Auguste Welten
Wiener Symphoniker as Play

References

External links

1950s historical musical films
Austrian historical musical films
Films directed by Georg C. Klaren
Films based on operas
Films set in 1811
Napoleonic Wars films
Films set in the Alps
Films shot at Rosenhügel Studios
Gaetano Donizetti